The 1969 Long Beach State 49ers football team represented California State College, Long Beach—now known as California State University, Long Beach—as a member of the Pacific Coast Athletic Association (PCAA) during the 1969 NCAA College Division football season. This was the team's first year in the newly-formed PCAA after 12 seasons as a member of the California Collegiate Athletic Association (CCAA). Led by first-year head coach Jim Stangeland, the 49ers compiled an overall record of 8–3 with a mark of 3–1 in conference play, placing second in the PCAA. The team played home games at Veterans Memorial Stadium adjacent to the campus of Long Beach City College in Long Beach, California.

Schedule

Team players in the NFL
The following were selected in the 1970 NFL Draft.

References

Long Beach State
Long Beach State 49ers football seasons
Long Beach State 49ers football